Now or Never is the fourth studio album by Canadian country music singer Brett Kissel. It was released on January 1, 2020 via Warner Music Canada. It won Album of the Year at the 2020 Canadian Country Music Association Awards.

Background
Kissel said "in previous years, previous albums, I didn’t have the courage to do a traditional country music on a project. Well, now we’ve recorded one. In previous years, I didn’t have the balls to record something so Pop/EDM because I was afraid of what people would think. Well, I’ve got one like that. All in all, I just wanted to destroy the box of what I thought was possible for a country record".

Content
"Now or Never" features eight tracks in total including Kissel's debut American single and #1 Canadian country hit "Drink About Me". Kissel noted how he incorporated tracks of different styles between traditional country, Canadian country, and pop country. Kissel stated that some songs found "a new direction" while others took him in "the direction of his roots", and that the album has "something for everybody".

Track listing

Personnel
Adapted from the CD booklet.

Jess Baumung - photography
Ben Bradley - drums
Spencer Cheyne - engineering, gang vocals
Spencer Clark - engineering
Jim Cooley - mixing
Ben Dartnell - photography
Emma-Lee Doty - background vocals
Jacob Durrett - production, recording, engineering, programming, electric guitar, acoustic guitar, bass guitar, drums, banjo, background vocals
Jordan Eberle - gang vocals
Josh Gwilliam - engineering
Mitch Jay - steel guitar
Mike Johnson - steel guitar
Jeff King - electric guitar
Brett Kissel - lead vocals, production, electric guitar, acoustic guitar, banjo, background vocals, album artwork
Cecilia Kissel - photography
Karen Kosowski - engineering, recording, vocal production, programming, piano
Justin Kudding - bass guitar, gang vocals
Bart McKay - production, recording, mixing, engineering, programming, piano, symphony programming, gang vocals
Matty McKay - engineering, vocal coaching, electric guitar, acoustic guitar, background vocals
Marc Rogers - bass guitar
Matt Rogers - background vocals
Connor Scheffler - album artwork
Ben Stennis - programming
Matt Streuby - gang vocals
Chris Stevens - programming
Christina Taylor - featured vocals on "I'm Not Him, I'm Not Her"
Tyler Volrath - acoustic guitar, fiddle, mandolin, banjo 
Will Weatherly - programming

Charts

Awards and nominations

Release history

See also
List of 2020 albums

References

2020 albums
Brett Kissel albums
Warner Music Group albums
Canadian Country Music Association Album of the Year albums